The 1949 Chattanooga Moccasins football team was an American football team that represented the University of Chattanooga (now known as the University of Tennessee at Chattanooga) as an independent during the 1948 college football season. In its 19th year under head coach Scrappy Moore, the team compiled a 5–4 record.

Schedule

References

Chattanooga
Chattanooga Mocs football seasons
Chattanooga Moccasins football